Shahrak, Iran may refer to:
Shahrak, Alborz
Shahrak, alternate name of Kian, Chaharmahal and Bakhtiari Province
Shahrak, East Azerbaijan
Shahrak, Fars
Shahrak, Hamadan
Shahrak, Kurdistan
Shahrak, Qazvin
Shahrak, Khvaf, Razavi Khorasan Province
Shahrak, Nishapur, Razavi Khorasan Province
Shahrak, Irandegan, Khash County, Sistan and Baluchestan Province
Shahrak, Kavandar, Khash County, Sistan and Baluchestan Province
Shahrak, West Azerbaijan
Shahrak, Zanjan
Shahrak Rural District, in Ardabil Province
Shahrak Rural District, in East Azerbaijan Province

See also
Shahrak, meaning "town", is a common element in Iranian place names